Tambo Grande District is one of ten districts of the province Piura in Peru. It was founded in 1840.

References